Tänk om jag ångrar mig, och sen ångrar mig igen is the ninth studio album by Swedish singer Lars Winnerbäck, released on 18 September 2009. The album topped Sverigetopplistan and also reached number 6 on VG-lista, the Norwegian Albums Chart. The album also placed at number 3 on the Swedish Year-end Album Chart of 2009 and was certified platinum in Sweden.

Track listing
"Järnvägsspår"
"Kedjebrev"
"Ett sällsynt exemplar"
"Du som reser mig"
"Du, min vän i livet"
"Jag får liksom ingen ordning"
"Jag fattar alltihop"
"Köpenhamn och överallt"
"Fribiljett mot himlen"
"Berätta hur du gör"

Personnel
 Lars Winnerbäck - vocals, guitar
 Ola Gustafsson - Guitar
 Jerker Odelholm - Bass, synthbas
 Johan Persson - Synthesizer, piano, guitar, vocals
 Anna Stadling - vocals, tambourin
 Anders Hernestam - drums, percussion, tambourin
 Anders Nygårds - violin, viola
 Malin-My Wall - violin
 Johanna Dahl - cello

Charts

Weekly charts

Year-end charts

References

2009 albums
Lars Winnerbäck albums